The Steel Claw can refer to:

The Steel Claw (film), a 1961 war film
The Steel Claw (comics), a British comics character created in 1962